Oumou Sow (born 1970) is a Guinean sprinter. She competed in the women's 200 metres at the 1992 Summer Olympics.

References

1970 births
Living people
Athletes (track and field) at the 1992 Summer Olympics
Guinean female sprinters
Olympic athletes of Guinea
Place of birth missing (living people)
Olympic female sprinters